Chestnut Hill is an unincorporated community located in central-southern Jefferson County, Tennessee, United States.

Education
Chestnut Hill School, part of the Jefferson County School System, was formerly located in the community, but closed due to lack of enrollment.

Economy
Chestnut Hill is the site of one of two canneries for the Bush Brothers and Company, which has a visitors' center in the community.

References

External links
Jefferson County Chamber of Commerce

Unincorporated communities in Tennessee
Unincorporated communities in Jefferson County, Tennessee